This article provides information on candidates who stood for the 2020 Queensland state election. The election was held on 31 October 2020.

Retiring Members

Labor
Kate Jones MP (Cooper) – announced 10 September 2020
Anthony Lynham MP (Stafford) – announced 10 September 2020
Coralee O'Rourke MP (Mundingburra) – announced 5 September 2020

Liberal National
Mark McArdle (Caloundra) – announced retirement 27 June 2019
Ted Sorensen (Hervey Bay) – announced retirement 25 May 2020
Simone Wilson (Pumicestone) – announced retirement 27 September 2019

Legislative Assembly
There are 597 candidates who nominated for the 2020 state election.

Sitting members are shown in bold text. Successful candidates are highlighted in the relevant colour. Where there is possible confusion, an asterisk (*) is also used.

Notes

References

Queensland-related lists
Candidates for Queensland state elections